The Conference Board, Inc. is a 501(c)(3) non-profit business membership and research group organization. It counts over 1,000 public and private corporations and other organizations as members, encompassing 60 countries. The Conference Board convenes conferences and peer-learning groups, conducts economic and business management research, and publishes several widely tracked economic indicators.

History
The organization was founded in 1916 as the National Industrial Conference Board (NICB). At the time, tensions between labor and management in the United States were seen as potentially explosive in the wake of the Triangle Shirtwaist Factory fire in 1911 and the Ludlow Massacre in 1914. In 1915 presidents of twelve major corporations in the United States and six leading industry associations met in Yama, New York to formulate the business community's response to continued labor unrest and growing public criticism.

After additional crisis meetings, the National Industrial Conference Board was officially founded May 5, 1916, at the Hotel Gramatan in Bronxville, New York. Although many of the organizations’ founders—including former AT&T president Frederick P. Fish and General Electric executive Magnus W. Alexander, its first president—had supported the open-shop movement, by 1916 they regarded national unions such as the American Federation of Labor as permanent fixtures of the American economy, and urged negotiation and concord.

When the United States entered World War I in 1917, the National War Labor Board formed by President Woodrow Wilson asked the NICB to formulate plans that would keep war industries running and strife-free. Its recommendations—based on cooperation between representatives of employers, employees, and government—were adopted in full. During and after the war, the NICB conducted pioneering research into workers' compensation laws and the eight-hour workday, and established the U.S. Cost of Living Index. Though often mistrusted in its early years as an “employers union” funding studies against the labor movement, the non-profit NICB was also seen “as a spokesman for the so-called progressive wing of the business community [and] produced hundreds of research reports on economic and social issues facing the United States.”

The organization today remains funded by the contributions of members, often Fortune 500 companies. By the 1930s, however, it had already lost most of its character as an industry lobby. Virgil Jordan, a writer and economist who replaced Alexander as president on the latter's death in 1932, established a Bureau of Economic Audit and Control to offer members and the public an independent source of studies on unemployment, pensions, healthcare, and related issues in the midst of the Great Depression, when many questioned the credibility of the government's economic statistics. Unions soon joined the NICB alongside corporations for access to its research, conferences, and executive network.

The organization is now considered an unbiased “trusted source for statistics and trends, second only to perhaps the U.S. Bureau of Labor Statistics”. After World War II, The Conference Board—the shortened name adopted in 1970—expanded to non-U.S. members for the first time. Today, it has offices in Brussels, Beijing, Mumbai, Hong Kong, and Singapore. The Conference Board of Canada was spun off as an independent non-profit in 1981.

In 1996, the US Department of Commerce selected The Conference Board to produce and distribute the US leading economic indicator series. This was the first time a US Government agency entrusts a major economic series to a private organization. Today, The Conference Board produces indicators for the US, Euro Area and eleven other countries. The composite economic indexes are designed to signal peaks and troughs in the business cycle.

In 2002, after an epidemic of business scandals, The Conference Board Commission on Public Trust and Private Enterprise is convened. Composed of a blue-ribbon panel of respected leaders from both the private and the public sectors, many of the Commission's recommendations were voluntarily adopted by leading companies and continue as best practices in corporate governance.

In 2006, The Conference Board established its China Center for Economic and Business in Beijing as a resource for senior executives with a significant strategic interest in China's fast-evolving economy through events, publications, indicators, and peer-group CEO Council sessions. In 2008, The Conference Board likewise opened its first Indian office, in Mumbai.

In 2007, The Conference Board took over publication of the Total Economy Database and two years later began release an annual Global Economic Outlook series that now encompasses annual growth projections for over 65 economies.

The Conference Board assumed control of the International Labor Comparisons (ILC) program, formerly a division of the US Bureau of Labor Statistics, in 2013 due to across-the-board federal spending cuts. ILC produces internationally comparative datasets on labor conditions, productivity, income, and more using the same concepts and methodology as those previously used by BLS.

In January 2015, the Committee for Economic Development (CED) merged with The Conference Board as its US public-policy center headquartered in Washington, DC. The Conference Board celebrated 100 years of operation in 2016, followed by CED's 75th anniversary in 2017.In 2018, The Conference Board expanded its global footprint further by launching the Gulf Center for Economics and Business Research, based in Kuwait.

In 2020, amid the ongoing COVID-19 pandemic, The Conference Board launched a dedicated online hub and resource center for helping businesses navigate its unprecedented economic, human capital, ESG, public policy and communications challenges.

The Conference Board has likewise emerged as a national voice on the role of American business in advancing U.S. racial, social, and economic equity. Since March 2020, its Building a More Civil and Just Society series has convened panels, personal interviews, and a three-day virtual conference on the intertwined challenges of racism, economic opportunity, early childhood education, healthcare access, corporate governance, and equality in the workplace. The series has featured dozens of Fortune 500 CEOs and other executives, including Ken Chenault, Ron Williams, Julie Sweet, Dan Schulman, Michael J. Dowling, Marc Morial, Jo Kirchner, and Steve Odland.

In 2021 The Conference Board launched CEO Perspectives, a twice-monthly podcast hosted by its President & CEO, Steve Odland. The conversations feature thought leaders discussing an array of topics relevant to business executives.

In response to the 2022 Russian invasion of Ukraine, The Conference Board launched a Geopolitics Hub to provide a 360° view of geopolitical crises, starting with the Russo-Ukrainian war. The hub provides insights, analysis, and commentary on what the upended geopolitical terrain means for business.

The Conference Board also launched a Global Recession Hub in 2022, bringing together real-time growth forecasts for over 70 global economies, expert analysis on the monetary and fiscal response to economic challenges, and research analyzing recession’s impact on ESG, public policy, human capital and HR, marketing and communications, and beyond.

Membership and professional development 
The Conference Board's membership network encompasses the majority of the Fortune 500.

Each year, over 3,000 senior executives participate in The Conference Board Councils—peer-learning groups that bring together professionals to exchange ideas, discuss challenges, and advance their fields in intimate, confidential meetings held around the world. These range from networks organized for particular C-suite titles—including multiple councils for chief financial officers, chief human resources officers, chief legal officers, and corporate treasurers—to those focused on narrower areas of expertise or specific business challenges, from business continuity and responsible sourcing to advancing women in leadership and social media. The councils align with the focus areas of the organization's five centers.

The Conference Board hosts more than 50 public conferences each year across Europe, Asia, and North America. These include some of the longest standing annual events dedicated to employee healthcare, succession management, diversity, women's leadership, and leadership development. In addition to live events, The Conference Board produces dozens of interactive webcasts and public podcasts each month featuring influential executives, thought leaders, and emerging trends alongside its own team of researchers.

The Conference Board's professional development programming is recognized by a number of independent accreditation organizations, which award continuing education credits to qualifying participants of its conferences, councils, webcasts, and virtual events. These include the HR Certification Institute, the Society For Human Resource Management, the National Association of State Boards of Accountancy, the International Association of Privacy Professionals, the International Coaching Federation, the Compliance Certification Board, and continuing legal education bodies.

Focus Areas and Regional Centers 
The Conference Board produces original research, convenes conferences, and organizes executive peer-learning councils through topical Centers based in business hubs around the globe. In the United States, it currently operates five Centers from New York City and Washington, DC:

 Economy, Strategy & Finance - including global economy, innovation and digital transformation, labor markets, consumer dynamics
 Marketing & Communications - corporate communications, consumer dynamics, marketing 
 Environmental, Social & Governance - corporate governance, sustainability, corporate citizenship and philanthropy 
 Human Capital - leadership, learning and development, talent acquisition, employee engagement and experience, diversity and inclusion, HR technology, human capital analytics, labor markets, coaching and mentoring
 Committee for Economic Development (Public Policy) - regulation, healthcare policy, education, infrastructure, tax reform, fiscal health, immigration

In Europe, The Conference Board also hosts three Centers from is regional headquarters in Brussels:

 ESG
 Economy, Strategy & Finance
 Human Capital

In the Asia-Pacific region, the organization currently features two Centers:

 Human Capital
 ESG

Additionally, The Conference Board operates a dedicated China Center in Beijing, and was one of the first US business think tanks to establish an on-the-ground presence to understanding the rapid transformation of the Chinese economy.

Founded in 2018, The Conference Board Gulf Center likewise serves the business community across the region.

Economic Indicators
The Conference Board publishes a number of regular indicators for United States and international economies that are widely tracked by investors and policy makers. They include:

 U.S. Consumer Confidence Index – Begun by The Conference Board in 1967, this monthly survey of 5,000 households is widely established as the leading measure of American consumer confidence. Results from the household survey are tabulated to provide a barometer of the U.S. economy (currently indexed to the year 1985 = 100).
 CEO Confidence Survey – The quarterly Measure of CEO Confidence gauges the outlook of chief executives in their own industries and the economy as a whole.
 Leading Economic Indexes – In the 1960s, the U.S. Department of Commerce began researching and releasing business cycle indicators, which use composite data points (including manufacturing, construction, and stock market indicators) to time economic expansions, recessions, and recoveries. In December 1995, The Conference Board took over the business indicator program from the government and continues to publish leading, coincident, and lagging indexes for the U.S. economy each month. The program was also expanded to other economies; beyond the U.S., The Conference Board currently publishes leading, coincident, and trailing indexes for the Australia, Brazil, China, the Euro Area, France, Germany, India, Japan, Mexico, South Korea, Spain, and the U.K. 
 Employment Trends Index – Created in 2008, the Employment Trends Index aggregates eight separate indicators and “offers a short-term, forward look at employment [that] gives economists and investors a new forecasting tool. It also helps business executives sharpen their short- to medium-term hiring and compensation planning.”
Help Wanted OnLine – The Help Wanted OnLine program uses crawler technology to survey job openings posted on approximately 1,000 online job boards. The monthly data series compares labor supply (job vacancies) against demand (unemployed workers) to determine the tightness of the job market for individual metro areas and occupation categories.  The online program is the successor of the Help Wanted Advertising Index, which surveyed print newspaper ads.

The organization also releases regular global and regional growth outlooks and commentaries on economic news.

Notable research
The Conference Board's research reports and experts are often featured in a wide range of global business media—from specialist trade publications to the Financial Times, the Wall Street Journal, CNBC, Bloomberg News, Forbes and Fortune.

Notable examples include:

 C-Suite Outlook – A recurring survey of the most pressing challenges and responses facing CEOs and other top executives across industries and regions.
 Annual benchmarking reports and data dashboards that reveal emerging trends in areas including CEO succession, executive compensation, corporate board practices, and shareholder voting.
 Annual survey on US salary increase budgets across industries and seniority. 
 Annual job satisfaction survey of U.S. workers.
 Annual survey on corporate communications practices and trends.
 The economic impact of the child care industry.
 The management and leadership preferences of millennials.
 Policy solutions for making capitalism more sustainable.

See also
The Conference Board of Canada

Notes

External links 
 The Conference Board's Board of Trustees
 The Conference Board, Inc. website
 The Conference Board of Canada website
 
 
 Industrial Conference Board Records. 1953-1963. 200 items. At the Labor Archives of Washington, University of Washington Libraries Special Collections.
 Online Books by National Industrial Conference Board at UPenn Library
 Publications by National Industrial Conference Board at Hathi Trust Digital Library
 Publications by Conference Board at Hathi Trust Digital Library
 Mises Institute: American Affairs 1945-1950

Archives 

 Industrial Conference Board Records, 1953-1963. Approximately 200 items. At the Labor Archives of Washington, University of Washington Libraries Special Collections. 

1916 establishments in New York (state)
Business organizations based in the United States
Organizations established in 1916